The Fourth Ward School is an historic 4-story mansard-roofed former public school building located at 537 South "C" Street in Virginia City, Nevada. Designed in 1876 by architect C. M. Bennett in the Second Empire style of architecture, it originally held over 1000 students in grades 1 though 9 divided into three departments: primary (grades 1 though 4); second grammar (grades 5 though 7) and high school (grades 8 and 9).  Grades 10 through 12 were added by 1909. It graduated its last class in 1936, after which its students were moved to a new school built by the Works Progress Administration.

The building then fell into disrepair and remained closed until 1986 when it was reopened as the Historic Fourth Ward School Museum.  The museum features exhibits of city history, 19th-century education, Mark Twain’s life, area mining and a letter printing press.

The Fourth Ward School is a contributing property in the Virginia City Historic District which was declared a National Historic Landmark in 1961 and added to the National Register of Historic Places in 1966.

References

External links
Official website
Historic Marker Data Base listing for Fourth Ward School

Buildings and structures in Virginia City, Nevada
1876 establishments in Nevada
School buildings on the National Register of Historic Places in Nevada
Education museums in the United States
History museums in Nevada
Museums in Virginia City, Nevada
Historic American Buildings Survey in Nevada
Historic district contributing properties in Nevada
National Register of Historic Places in Storey County, Nevada
Neoclassical architecture in Nevada
Second Empire architecture in Nevada
Works Progress Administration in Nevada